Radoslav Bonchev Dimitrov (born 12 August 1988) is a Bulgarian professional footballer who plays as a defender for Liga I side Sepsi OSK.

Career
Dimitrov began his football career at the Litex Lovech's Youth Academy. He failed to break into the first team, and went out on loan to Montana and then Sportist Svoge.

In January 2009, Dimitrov joined Slavia Sofia. He made his league debut on 9 March 2009, coming on as a second-half substitute during the 1–0 away win over Litex Lovech. Dimitrov's first start for Slavia came on 17 March in their 5–2 away victory over Belasitsa Petrich, playing 56 minutes.

In January 2010, Dimitrov was loaned out to fellow A PFG club Montana for the rest of the season. He returned to Slavia at the end of the season having made 13 appearances in Montana's successful battle against relegation.

Dimitrov became a regular starter for Slavia during the 2010–11 A PFG season. On 4 December 2010, he tallied his first goal to give Slavia a 1–0 win against Etar 1924 for Bulgarian Cup. He netted his first league goal against Lokomotiv Plovdiv on 2 April 2011, scoring the equalizing goal as the game ended in a 1–1 draw.

After 5 years of playing for Slavia Dimitrov was released and in June 2014 he signed a 2-year contract with Levski Sofia.

International career
On 15 March 2013, Dimitrov received his first call-up to play for the Bulgarian national team for 2014 World Cup Qualifiers against Malta and Denmark. On 22 March, he made his debut in a 6–0 win over Malta, coming on as a substitute for Yordan Minev.

On 10 September, Dimitrov started as a first-team choice in the qualification game against Malta. He scored the opening goal of the game managing to score his first international goal. The game ended with a 2–1 victory for Bulgaria.

Career statistics

Club

International

Scores and results list Bulgaria's goal tally first.

Honours

Club 
Slavia Sofia
Bulgarian Cup runner-up: 2010–11

Universitatea Craiova
Cupa României: 2017–18
Supercupa României runner-up: 2018

Sepsi OSK
Cupa României: 2021–22
Supercupa României: 2022

References

External links
 
 
 
 
 
 Profile at LevskiSofia.info

1988 births
Living people
Bulgarian footballers
Bulgaria under-21 international footballers
Bulgaria international footballers
First Professional Football League (Bulgaria) players
PFC Litex Lovech players
FC Sportist Svoge players
PFC Slavia Sofia players
FC Montana players
PFC Levski Sofia players
PFC Lokomotiv Plovdiv players
FC Botoșani players
CS Universitatea Craiova players
Sepsi OSK Sfântu Gheorghe players
Liga I players
Association football defenders
Expatriate footballers in Romania
Bulgarian expatriate sportspeople in Romania